Skiff Hill is a mountain in Barnstable County, Massachusetts. It is located northeast of Orleans in the Town of Eastham. Fort Hill is located south of Skiff Hill.

References

Mountains of Massachusetts
Mountains of Barnstable County, Massachusetts